Yegor Sergeyevich Tarakanov (born 17 April 1987) is a Russian professional football player.

Club career
He made his Russian Premier League debut for FC Torpedo Moscow on 12 August 2014 in a game against FC Amkar Perm.

References

External links
 
 

1987 births
Sportspeople from Izhevsk
Living people
Russian footballers
FC Volga Nizhny Novgorod players
FC Krasnodar players
FC Chernomorets Novorossiysk players
FC Nizhny Novgorod (2007) players
FC Torpedo Moscow players
Russian Premier League players
FC Izhevsk players
FC Armavir players
FC Pyunik players
Russian expatriate footballers
Expatriate footballers in Armenia
Association football defenders
FC Neftekhimik Nizhnekamsk players
FC Ararat Moscow players
FC Urozhay Krasnodar players